The Asterozoa are a subphylum in the phylum Echinodermata. Characteristics include a star-shaped body and radially divergent axes of symmetry. The subphylum includes the class Asteroidea (the starfish), the class Ophiuroidea (the brittle stars and basket stars), and the extinct order Somasteroidea.

Taxonomy

Asteroidea

Members of the order Asteroidea are characterised by a star-shaped body plan consisting of a central disc and multiple radiating arms. They usually exhibit pentamerous radial symmetry, but some species typically have a symmetry based on a number other than five. The arms have very broad bases and their skeletal support is provided by the calcareous plates called ossicles or ambulacral plates in the body wall. These are joined with muscular and connective tissue giving flexibility. The mouth is on the lower or oral surface, with a corresponding anus on the upper or aboral surface; though the anus is absent in Paxillosida, wherein the mouth serves also as an anus, otherwise leading to a blind gut, similar to their Ophiuroid relatives. Their large coelomic cavity can extend from the disc into the arms. The paired gonads are also located in the arms and release gametes via the gonoducts. The lateral flexion of the arms is limited by how the ambulacral plates are arranged. On the oral surface of the disc and radiating arms are four rows of ambulacral plates which are associated with two or four rows of tube feet,  which are used in locomotion.  On the upper or aboral surface of the disc is an opening, the madreporite. This is connected to the water vascular system which assists in respiration and provides hydraulic pressure for the tube feet.

Ophiuroidea

Members of the order Ophiuroidea are characterised by having the gut and internal organs confined to the central disc. The arms are clearly separated from the disc. The tube feet do not have adhesive properties, but serve a sensory function. In all the extant genera, the ambulacral plates are fused in pairs and form joints in the arms, known as vertebrae. In some extinct genera, they are not fused in this way. The ambulacral grooves function as internal epineural canals.

Somasteroidea

All members of the order Somasteroidea (or Stomasteroidea) are extinct. Their first appearance in the fossil record was in the early Ordovician and they had probably died out by the late Devonian. They are similar to the asteroids in that their bodies are flattened dorsoventrally and they have five petaloid arms with broad bases. The ambulacral plates in somasteroids are simple and unspecialized, and the arms were thought to be not flexible and were unable  to assist in feeding, but the oral mouth parts were more complex. According to the World Register of Marine Species, the Stelleroidea are no longer considered valid. WoRMS states, the name harks back to a previous view of the classification of the echinoderms and its members are now included in Asterozoa. An example for Somasteroidea is Villebrunaster fezouataensis.

References

 
Animal subphyla
Extant Ordovician first appearances